Robert Cunningham (April 22, 1936 – June 20, 2006) was an American college basketball player. He was one of the five starters on the 1957 national champion North Carolina Tar Heels who was brought by coach Frank McGuire from New York.  Cunningham was considered the team's best defensive player.

Cunningham died at age 70 in a Savannah, Georgia, hospital after battling both cancer and a heart attack.

References

1936 births
2006 deaths
American men's basketball players
Basketball players from New York City
Forwards (basketball)
Guards (basketball)
North Carolina Tar Heels men's basketball players